is a Japanese professional wrestler signed to World Wonder Ring Stardom, where she competes under the ring name , and is the leader of the Cosmic Angels stable. Nakano is a former three-time Artist of Stardom Champion, as well as a former Wonder of Stardom Champion

Nakano began her career in the Actwres girl'Z promotion as an idol in 2015 before training under Yuna Manase and making her debut as a professional wrestler in July 2016. Nakano left the promotion in 2017, and began working for Frontier Martial Arts Wrestling (FMW) and World Wonder Ring Stardom as a freelancer before officially signing with Stardom in November 2017.

Professional wrestling career

Actwres Girl’z and freelancing (2016–2017) 
Tauchi began dancing at the age of 3 and eventually became a dance instructor in 2012. She joined the underground idol group known as Katamomi Joshi, and was active with them until April 2015. In interviews since she has stated that she struggled a lot in the group, and would argue with management and go home crying most days. She then joined the group Infom@te, who performed before and during professional wrestling shows for the Actwres girl'Z promotion. Nakano continued to regularly compete in Actwres girl'Z until June 2017, when she announced she would be leaving the promotion to become a freelancer. Nakano's first match as a freelancer took place 2 days later, when she and Manami Katsu defeated Miss Koharu and Miss Mongol.

World Wonder Ring Stardom (2017–present) 
Nakano appeared at the World Wonder Ring Stardom show in Korakuen Hall on July 16, 2017, and announced her intentions to compete in the 2017 5★STAR GP. On August 13, Nakano qualified for the tournament after defeating Natsuko Tora. Nakano finished the tournament with 1 win and two points, unable to advance to the finals. On September 9, Nakano turned heel for the first time in her career, joining the villainous Oedo Tai faction. In October, Nakano suffered an injury and was unable to compete, but continued to appear with Oedo Tai as a manager, and introduced her mascot, a stuffed panda known as Producer P. On November 1, Nakano officially signed with the promotion. On January 21, 2018, as a result of being the last person eliminated in a special Queen's Quest vs Oedo Tai gauntlet match, Nakano was kicked out of Oedo Tai. She subsequently turned face and began teaming with Mayu Iwatani. On February 18, the duo unsuccessfully challenged Tam's former stablemates Hana Kimura and Kagetsu for the Goddess of Stardom Championship. On April 1 at Stardom Dream Slam 2018 in Nagoya, Nakano teamed with Stardom ace Io Shirai to defeat Oedo Tai (Kagetsu and Sumire Natsu) in a current blast exploding bat deathmatch. On September 30, Nakano, along with Iwatani and Saki Kashima, defeated J.A.N. (Jungle Kyona, Natsuko Tora and Kaori Yoneyama) to win the Artist of Stardom Championship, Nakano's first title in professional wrestling.

As of the 2019 Stardom Draft, Nakano has been an active member of Iwatani's stable Stars. In the 2019 Cinderella Tournament, Nakano  faced her old stablemate Kagetsu in the first round, with the two fighting to a time limit draw, thus both were eliminated. On May 16, Iwatani, Kashima and Nakano lost the Artist of Stardom Championship to Tokyo Cyber Squad (Kimura, Konami and Kyona), ending their reign at 228 days. On June 16, Nakano challenged Arisa Hoshiki for the Wonder of Stardom Championship, but was unsuccessful. Nakano, along with Iwatani and Kashima, won back the title on June 23, however, lost it in the next month on July 20. On November 15, Nakano, along with Hoshiki, won the annual Goddesses of Stardom Tag League, when they defeated Bea Priestley and Jamie Hayter in the finals. After winning the Tag League, Hoshiki and Nakano challenged Konami and Kyona on November 24 for the Goddesses of Stardom Championship, but were unsuccessful.

On July 26, 2020 at Stardom Cinderella Summer In Tokyo, Nakano challenged Giulia for the vacant Wonder of Stardom Championship, but was unsuccessful as Giulia became the new champion. On October 3, Nakano challenged Giulia again for the Wonder of Stardom Championship, however, was unsuccessful in the second time. On November 15, Nakano, along with fellow Stars members Mina Shirakawa and Unagi Sayaka formed a new group within Stars named "Cosmic Angels (professional wrestling)", as the trio defeated Kashima, Rina and Tora. On December 16, Cosmic Angels defeated Kashima, Priestley and Tora to win the Artist of Stardom Championship. On December 20, after Cosmic Angels had their first successful title defense against Gokigen Death, Iwatani and Starlight Kid, Iwatani announced that Cosmic Angels are leaving Stars to be their own unit.

On March 3, 2021, at All Star Dream Cinderella, Nakano defeated Giulia in a hair vs. hair match for the Wonder of Stardom Championship, which was her first singles title in the promotion. On December 29 at Stardom Dream Queendom, she was defeated by  Saya Kamitani in a match for the title, ending her reign with 301 days.

New Japan Pro Wrestling (2021) 
On January 5, 2021, at the second night of New Japan Pro-Wrestling (NJPW)'s Wrestle Kingdom 15, Nakano made her first NJPW appearance where she, alongside Iwatani, lost to Giulia and Syuri in a dark match.

Personal life 
Tauchi is trained in kung fu and pays tribute to this with her ring attire and fighting style.

Championships and Accomplishments 
 Pro Wrestling Illustrated
 Ranked No. 76 of the top 100 female wrestlers in the PWI Female 100 in 2019
 Ranked No. 9 of the top 150 female wrestlers in the PWI Women's 150 in 2021
 World Wonder Ring Stardom
 Wonder of Stardom Championship (1 time)
 Goddess of Stardom Championship (1 time) – with Natsupoi
 Artist of Stardom Championship (3 times) – with Mayu Iwatani and Saki Kashima (2), and Mina Shirakawa and Unagi Sayaka (1)
 Goddesses of Stardom Tag League (2019) – with Arisa Hoshiki
 5★Star GP Award (3 times)
 5★Star GP Finalist Award (2022)
 5★Star GP Best Match Award (2020) 
 5★Star GP Technique Award (2019)
 Stardom Year-End Award (4 times)
 Best Match Award (2019) 
 Best Match Award (2021) 
 Best Tag Team Award (2022) 
 Fighting Spirit Award (2020)
 Shining Award (2022)

Luchas de Apuestas record

References

External links 
 official blog - 公式ブログ

Living people
Sportspeople from Aichi Prefecture
Japanese female professional wrestlers
21st-century professional wrestlers
Wonder of Stardom Champions
Goddess of Stardom Champions
Year of birth missing (living people)